Dmytro Volodymyrovych Tabachnyk (born November 26, 1963) is a pro-Russian Ukrainian politician, and former science and education minister of Ukraine. Tabachnyk is among former Ukrainian officials who have had their assets frozen by EU and is wanted in Ukraine for embezzlement and abuse of office. As a fugitive, he is believed to be in Israel and Crimea.

Career
In 1986 Tabachnyk graduated from the faculty of History of Kyiv University.

Initially he worked in the State Archives as a curator of materials about the Kyiv chapter of the Komsomol.

In 1990 he became a delegate to the Kyiv City Council. From 1991–92 he was a consultant in the Secretariat of the Verkhovna Rada. From 1993 he was in charge of Information and Press for the Cabinet of Ministers.

In 1994 he became the head of the Committee to elect Leonid Kuchma as president of Ukraine where he was accused of falsification of sociological data.

Tabachnyk was a Member of Parliament from March 1998 through March 2003 for Labour Ukraine.

In November 2002 through February 2005, he served as vice premier in the First Yanukovych Government. April 2006 through December 2007, Tabachnyk was a vice premier in the Second Yanukovych Government. He became a Party of Regions MP again following the 2007 Ukrainian parliamentary election.

In 1996 he was accused of influencing peddling the Supreme Court regarding the death penalty given to a terrorist action perpetrated by a Russian national in Simferopol.

He was forced to resign from Parliament because he illegally procured for himself the military title of colonel.

From 1997–8 he was an advisor to President Kuchma.

In 2002–2005 he became vice-premier minister of Ukraine under Victor Yanukovych. During this period he was involved with the scandal of donating letters by Ukrainian historian Mykhailo Hrushevsky to the Ukrainian archive in Kyiv which had previously been stolen from the Lviv archives.

In March 2006, he was elected to the Supreme Council of Crimea as a deputy of the For Yanukovych! Bloc.

Minister of education and science of Ukraine
On March 11, 2010, the day the Azarov Government and thus Tabachnyk was installed, the Lviv branch of Forward, Ukraine! started to collect signatures in support of the dismissal of Education and Science Minister Dmytro Tabachnyk. On March 17, 2010 the Administration of the Ukrainian Catholic University appealed to the education community in Ukraine to come out publicly about the situation in the education field after the appointment of Tabachnyk as education and science minister. According to them "Tabachnyk has been openly and publicly humiliating the Ukrainian intelligentsia, as well as Ukrainian language and Ukrainian culture, kindling hostility among the various regions of Ukraine, vindicating the human-hating Stalinist regime, which has been condemned alongside fascism for crimes against humanity by the Parliamentary Assembly of the Organization of Security and Cooperation in Europe; he doubts the sacrifices borne by the Ukrainian people in the times of the Soviet totalitarianism". 5,000 people hold a rally in Lviv in support of Tabachnyk's dismissal on March 17, 2010. Vyacheslav Kyrylenko, leader of For Ukraine!, stated during the rally that his party would work tirelessly to oust Tabachnyk from his post. Kyrylenko has introduced a resolution asking the Ukrainian parliament to dismiss Tabachnyk; the vote could take place as early as March 30, 2010. The initiative is being supported by other opposition groups, including Bloc Yulia Tymoshenko.

Faced with these protests Tabachnyk stated on March 17, 2010 he would keep his ideas about the country’s history to himself. Tabachnyk also promised not to backpedal on the "progressive educational reforms" (the Bologna education system and independent testing, which claims to "objectively determine students’ knowledge and is a critical component in ensuring they can enter university without paying bribes") that have already been introduced. President Victor Yanukovych had campaigned on the promise to abolish testing in 2009. As late as March 15, 2010 his deputy, Hanna Herman, maintained they would be eliminated. Herman also stated Yanukovych had privately met with Tabachnyk on March 15 and put him on notice. “He had to promise the president to hide under lock and key his personal views and anti-Ukrainian statements and strictly follow the education policy approved by the parliament and the Cabinet of Ministers. If he breaches that agreement, the president will take an adequate decision”.

By March 17, 2010 four of western Ukraine’s regional councils had passed resolutions calling for the minister’s dismissal. A host of civic and student organizations from all over the country (including Kherson in southern Ukraine and Donetsk in eastern Ukraine), authors and former Soviet dissidents also signed petitions calling for his removal.

Tabachnyk dismissed these campaigns against him as “witch hunts” stating “If they don’t like my articles, they should turn to the editors who published them.”

At same moment rectors of some leading Ukrainian colleges and universities, intellectual and cultural leaders of Ukraine applied to the President and Prime Minister of Ukraine, the chairman of the Supreme Rada, in support of Dmitry Tabachnyk. They named opened propaganda campaign against Tabachnyk in this position as “gamble and speculations of certain political forces”. Authors of the said statement recalled a positive results of Tabachnyk's work in a position of the vice-premier in Yanukovych Government in the past.

On March 20, 2010 Ukrainian national television broadcasting company — Inter — made live sociological interrogation at prime time, asking respondents to answer a question if they are supporting Tabachnyk in position of Science and education minister or against him. Results were that 67% have supported him in this position and 33% said that he has to be resigned. It being said that about 30,000 respondents voted.

A website was created to support Tabachnyk in position of Science and education minister. It contains open letter to President and Prime Minister of Ukraine “from representatives of intellectuals, mass media and the non-governmental organisations of Ukraine in support of Dmitry Tabachnyk on a post of the Minister of Education and Science of Ukraine”.

Former President Viktor Yushchenko warned his successor, Viktor Yanukovych, against appointing Tabachnyk as minister, stating "This is a minister who can only bring division in higher education and in Ukrainian education".

On March 19, 2010 the Supreme Council of the Autonomous Republic of Crimea applied to President Viktor Yanukovych, the Verkhovna Rada (Ukrainian parliament), and the Cabinet of Ministers to keep Tabachnyk in position of Science and Education Minister of Ukraine. While by March 25, 2010 the Volyn Oblast council (the provincial parliament), Lviv Oblast council, Ternopil Oblast Council, Ivano-Frankivsk Oblast council, Rivne Oblast council, as well as Sumy municipal council, Lutsk municipal council and Lviv municipal council had applied to these same institutions with the exact opposite demand.

On March 27, 2010 over 2,000 students supporting Tabachnyk hold a meeting in Odesa. Participants proclaimed they wanted to show their support to new minister and reforms in his Ministry.

On March 30 a total of 202 lawmakers with 226 needed voted in favour of a bill asking for Tabachnyk's dismissal. A new bill was registered the same day; "We'll do that until this man leaves Ukrainian education" Our Ukraine-People's Self-Defense faction member Viacheslav Kyrylenko stated.

On May 13, 2010 Tabachnyk announced Ukraine and Russia intend to develop a common textbook for history teachers. March 2010 Tabachnik had stated that Ukrainian history textbooks contained "simply false" information and announced his intention to rewrite them. He also promised to personally re-read high school books on history, literature and humanitarian subjects.

Tabachnyk was placed at number 11 on the electoral list of Party of Regions during the 2012 Ukrainian parliamentary election. He was re-elected into parliament.

In 2013 the Ukrainian Ministry of Education removed leading figures in Ukraine after the Russian Revolution, Ukrainian nationalists like Stepan Bandera and Roman Shukhevych and a number of Soviet dissidents of the list of "minimum necessary knowledge of graduates" and replaced them with Soviet military leaders and Communist Party of the Soviet Union party activists.

On February 23, 2014, just after the "Maidan revolution", the Verkhovna Rada dismissed Foreign Minister Leonid Kozhara and Education Minister Tabachnyk.

View of Ukraine’s history
Tabachnyk is loathed by opposition politicians for his view of Ukraine’s history which includes the thesis that western Ukrainians are not really Ukrainian. In a 2009 article for the Russian newspaper Izvestia, Tabachnyk wrote: “Halychany (western Ukrainians) practically don’t have anything in common with the people of Great Ukraine, not in mentality, not in religion, not in linguistics, not in the political arena” “We have different enemies and different allies. Furthermore, our allies and even brothers are their enemies, and their ‘heroes’ (Stepan Bandera, Roman Shukhevych) for us are killers, traitors and abettors of Hitler’s executioners.”

Tabachnyk also denies that the Holodomor was a genocide, considering it an invention of foreign historians for political motives.

Political views

Tabachnyk has advocated expanding the rights of Russian-language speakers and is loathed by some politicians and branded as being anti-Ukrainian.

On March 12, 2010, Member of Parliament Vyacheslav Kyrylenko of the Our Ukraine–People's Self-Defense Bloc faction registered with the Ukrainian parliament a draft resolution to dismiss Tabachnyk from the ministerial post. On March 30 (2010) a total of 202 lawmakers with 226 needed voted for a bill on Tabachnyk's dismissal. Kyrylenko stated after this he would register new bills "until this man leaves Ukrainian education".

A request to dismiss Tabachnyk by March 25, 2010 was made by the Volyn Oblast council (parliament of the province), Lviv Oblast council, Ternopil Oblast Council, Ivano-Frankivsk Oblast council, Rivne Oblast council, as well as Sumy municipal council, Lutsk. municipal council and Lviv municipal council in an appeal to President Viktor Yanukovych, the Verkhovna Rada (Ukrainian parliament) and the Cabinet of Ministers. On March 19, 2010 the Supreme Council of the Autonomous Republic of Crimea asked parliament, government and Yanukovych to keep Tabachnyk in the minister post.

According to Anders Åslund (in October 2012) Tabachnyk "could hardly care less about the real problems in Ukrainian education" but instead "His endeavor to sovietize Ukrainian historiography and promote russification attracts most attention". Åslund further argued that Tabachnyk's "greatest 'reform' had been to reduce ordinary school from the European standard of [year] 12 to [year] 11, seemingly inspired by the destruction instigated by the late Turkmenbashi".

Personal life
Tabachnyk is married to Tatiana Nazarova, an actress of the Lesya Ukrainka National Academic Theater of Russian Drama. 
Tabachnyk was born into a family of the technical intelligentsia. His father, Volodymyr Ihorovych Tabachnyk, was a Jew, was born in 1940 and was an aircraft manufacturing engineer (i.e. aerospace engineer). His mother, Alla Viktorivna Glyebova, was Russian, and was a structural engineer. She was born in 1938.

Honours 
 Табачник, Дмитрий Владимирович
 Order of Prince Yaroslav the Wise
 Order of Bohdan Khmelnytsky 3rd class
 Grand Cross of the Order of Merit of the Italian Republic (October 28, 1996).
 Grand Officer of Order of Merit (Portugal) (April 16, 1998)
 Commander's Grand Cross of the Order of the Lithuanian Grand Duke Gediminas.
 Order of Merit of the Republic of Poland
 Medal "For Courage in a Fire" (USSR)

References

External links 

1963 births
Living people
20th-century Ukrainian historians
Recipients of the Order of Bohdan Khmelnytsky, 3rd class
Recipients of the Order of Merit of the Italian Republic
Commander's Grand Crosses of the Order of the Lithuanian Grand Duke Gediminas
Vice Prime Ministers of Ukraine
Education and science ministers of Ukraine
Education and science, youth and sport ministers of Ukraine
Third convocation members of the Verkhovna Rada
Fourth convocation members of the Verkhovna Rada
Sixth convocation members of the Verkhovna Rada
Seventh convocation members of the Verkhovna Rada
Party of Regions politicians
Politicians from Kyiv
Pro-government people of the Euromaidan
Head of the Presidential Administration of Ukraine
Taras Shevchenko National University of Kyiv alumni
Recipients of the Order of Prince Yaroslav the Wise, 4th class
Laureates of the State Prize of Ukraine in Science and Technology
Russian individuals subject to European Union sanctions
Recipients of the Honorary Diploma of the Cabinet of Ministers of Ukraine